Leucorhynchia is a genus of very small sea snails, marine gastropod mollusks in the family Skeneidae.

Distribution
This marine species occurs off the Gulf of Oman, Singapore, Indo-Malaysia, Central and East Indian Ocean, Papua New Guinea, New Caledonia, Tuvalu, Western Pacific Ocean, Queensland, Australia, and Western Africa.

Species
Species within the genus Leucorhynchia include:
 
 Leucorhynchia amoena (Thiele, 1925)
 Leucorhynchia arctusulculus Rubio & Rolán, 2019
 Leucorhynchia asessa Rubio, Rolán & Gori, 2019
 Leucorhynchia australis Rubio, Rolán & Gori, 2019
 Leucorhynchia barreiroi Rubio & Rolán, 2019
 Leucorhynchia basiscostae Rubio, Rolán & Gori, 2019
 Leucorhynchia bicarinata Adam & Knudsen, 1969
 Leucorhynchia bilinguae Rubio & Rolán, 2019
 Leucorhynchia caledonica Crosse, 1867
 Leucorhynchia candida (A. Adams, 1862) 
 Leucorhynchia carbegtel Rubio, Rolán & Gori, 2019
 Leucorhynchia carigracilis Rubio, Rolán & Gori, 2019
 Leucorhynchia carinampla Rubio, Rolán & Gori, 2019
 Leucorhynchia catenata Rubio & Rolán, 2019
 Leucorhynchia celata Rubio & Rolán, 2019
 Leucorhynchia colurible Rubio, Rolán & Gori, 2019
 Leucorhynchia confortinii Rubio, Rolán & Gori, 2019
 Leucorhynchia crinita Rubio, Rolán & Gori, 2019
 Leucorhynchia crossei Tryon, 1888
 Leucorhynchia depressa Rubio & Rolán, 2019
 Leucorhynchia distorta Rubio, Rolán & Gori, 2019
 Leucorhynchia fecitae Rubio, Rolán & Gori, 2019
 Leucorhynchia fereglabra Rubio, Rolán & Gori, 2019
 Leucorhynchia funiculata Rubio & Rolán, 2019
 Leucorhynchia garciarodejai Rubio & Rolán, 2019
 Leucorhynchia glabra Rubio & Rolán, 2019
 Leucorhynchia globosa Rubio & Rolán, 2019
 Leucorhynchia gorii Rolán & Rubio, 2012 
 Leucorhynchia haesitans Rubio & Rolán, 2019
 Leucorhynchia impolita Rubio & Rolán, 2019
 Leucorhynchia iterata Rubio & Rolán, 2019
 Leucorhynchia letourneuxi Rubio & Rolán, 2019
 Leucorhynchia levinicium Rubio, Rolán & Gori, 2019
 Leucorhynchia levis Rubio & Rolán, 2019
 Leucorhynchia lingula Rubio & Rolán, 2019
 Leucorhynchia lirata (E.A. Smith, 1871)
 Leucorhynchia lluviae Rubio & Rolán, 2019
 Leucorhynchia magnucleus Rubio & Rolán, 2019
 Leucorhynchia marcosi Rubio & Rolán, 2019
 Leucorhynchia microstriata Rubio & Rolán, 2019
 Leucorhynchia microtuberculata Rubio & Rolán, 2019
 Leucorhynchia minor Rolán & Gori, 2013
 Leucorhynchia monteiroi Rubio, Rolán & Gori, 2019
 Leucorhynchia multistriata Rubio & Rolán, 2019
 Leucorhynchia nitida Briart & Cornet, 1887 †
 Leucorhynchia omanensis (Thiele, 1925)
 Leucorhynchia operta Rubio & Rolán, 2019
 Leucorhynchia ornatissima (Thiele, 1925)
 Leucorhynchia osaculeatum Rubio & Rolán, 2019
 Leucorhynchia osmagnum Rubio, Rolán & Gori, 2019
 Leucorhynchia papuaensis Rubio & Rolán, 2019
 Leucorhynchia parvicostae Rubio, Rolán & Gori, 2019
 Leucorhynchia paucistriata Rubio & Rolán, 2019
 Leucorhynchia peculiaris Rubio & Rolán, 2019
 Leucorhynchia perinde Rubio & Rolán, 2019
 Leucorhynchia perpolita Rubio & Rolán, 2019
 Leucorhynchia persculpturata Rubio & Rolán, 2019
 Leucorhynchia philippinensis Rubio & Rolán, 2019
 Leucorhynchia plena Rubio & Rolán, 2019
 Leucorhynchia plicata (E. A. Smith, 1872)
 Leucorhynchia plicifera (Thiele, 1925)
 Leucorhynchia plurilicium Rubio, Rolán & Gori, 2019
 Leucorhynchia poteli Rubio & Rolán, 2019
 Leucorhynchia prominens Rubio & Rolán, 2019
 Leucorhynchia punctata (Jousseaume, 1872)
 Leucorhynchia radiata Rubio & Rolán, 2019
 Leucorhynchia raquelae Rubio & Rolán, 2019
 Leucorhynchia redita Rubio & Rolán, 2019
 Leucorhynchia reunionensis Rubio & Rolán, 2019
 Leucorhynchia robusta Rubio, Rolán & Gori, 2019
 Leucorhynchia rosinaeRubio & Rolán, 2019
 Leucorhynchia rotata (Hedley, 1899)
 Leucorhynchia rotellaeformis (Grateloup, 1832) †
 Leucorhynchia rotulina Darragh & Kendrick, 2000 †
 Leucorhynchia ryalli Rubio, Rolán & Gori, 2019
 Leucorhynchia salisburyi Rubio, Rolán & Gori, 2019
 Leucorhynchia sandrogorii Rubio & Rolán, 2019
 Leucorhynchia sculpturata Rubio & Rolán, 2019
 Leucorhynchia seminiformis Rubio & Rolán, 2019
 Leucorhynchia stellata Rubio, Rolán & Gori, 2019
 Leucorhynchia stephensoni Ladd, 1966 †
 Leucorhynchia striatissima Rubio, Rolán & Gori, 2019
 Leucorhynchia sulciobliqui Rubio & Rolán, 2019
 Leucorhynchia sulinitel Rubio & Rolán, 2019
 Leucorhynchia thailandensis Rubio, Rolán & Gori, 2019
 Leucorhynchia torta Rubio & Rolán, 2019
 Leucorhynchia tricarinata Melvill & Standen, 1896
 Leucorhynchia tryoni Pilsbry, 1891
 Leucorhynchia umbilicord Rubio & Rolán, 2019
 Leucorhynchia umbilifuni Rubio & Rolán, 2019
 Leucorhynchia undulans Rubio & Rolán, 2019
 Leucorhynchia valida Rubio & Rolán, 2019
 Leucorhynchia ventricosa Darragh & Kendrick, 2000 †
 Leucorhynchia zboroviensis Friedberg, 1928 †

References

 Trew, A., 1984. The Melvill-Tomlin Collection. Part 30. Trochacea. Handlists of the Molluscan Collections in the Department of Zoology, National Museum of Wales.
 Vaught, K. C. (1989). A classification of the living Mollusca. Melbourne, Florida : American Malacologists. xii + 189 pp
 Higo, S., Callomon, P. & Goto, Y. (1999) Catalogue and Bibliography of the Marine Shell-Bearing Mollusca of Japan. Elle Scientific Publications, Yao, Japan, 749 pp.
 Gofas, S.; Afonso, J.P.; Brandào, M. (Ed.). (S.a.). Conchas e Moluscos de Angola = Coquillages et Mollusques d'Angola. [Shells and molluscs of Angola]. Universidade Agostinho / Elf Aquitaine Angola: Angola. 140 pp
 Rubio F. & Rolán E. (2019). The genus Leucorhynchia Crosse, 1867 (Gastropoda, Skeneidae) in the tropical Indo-Pacific. Museo de Historia Natural / Universidade de Santiago de Compostela. . 287 pp.

External links
 Crosse H. (1867). Description d'un genre nouveau et de plusieurs espèces inédites provenant de la Nouvelle-Calédonie. Journal de Conchyliologie. 15(3): 312-321
 Rubio & Rolàn, Contributions to the knowledge of micromolluscs of West Africa; 2 Archaeogastropoda of São Tomé & Principe; Iberus v.9 (1990)

 
Skeneidae
Gastropod genera